The city of Charleston, Missouri, located in Missouri's 8th congressional district in southeastern Missouri, is the county seat and the largest city of Mississippi County, Missouri.  The city was incorporated in 1872.

References
 Missouri Secretary of State official manuals

Key

Charleston